Rodrigo Manuel Gómez (born 2 January 1993) is an Argentine professional footballer who plays for San Martín de Tucumán as a midfielder.

Career

Argentinos Juniors
While at Argentinos Juniors, Gomez made 39 league appearances, scoring four goals. His debut came on 4 May 2013 in a 2-1 loss to Lanús, in which he played all 90 minutes. His first goal came on 2 June 2013 in a 2-0 win over River Plate. His goal, assisted by Pedro Pablo Hernández, came in the 87th minute.

Independiente
In August 2014, Gomez was sold to Independiente for a fee in the region of €750,000. His debut came on 16 August 2014 in a 1-0 loss to Estudiantes. His first goal came on 14 May 2016 in a 2-0 win over Arsenal Sarandí. He came on as an 85th minute sub, replacing Emiliano Rigoni, and scored two minutes later, making the score 2-0.

Quilmes (Loan)
In January 2015, Gomez was sent out on a full year loan to Quilmes. He made his debut on 15 February 2015 in a 1-0 loss to Lanús. He would go on to play 29 matches on his loan. His first goal came on 28 February 2015, against his parent club Club Atlético Independiente, who decided not to enforce the rule that players they loaned out couldn't play against them. However, Independiente won the match 2-1. Gomez scored in the 39th minute.

Toluca
On 28 May 2016, Toluca signed Gómez from CA Independiente. He made his league debut on 31 July 2016 in a 1-0 loss to Chiapas.

Union
In January 2018, Gomez was loaned out to Unión de Santa Fe. He made his league debut on 28 January 2018 in a 2-1 win over Racing Club de Avellaneda. He was subbed on in the 66th minute, replacing Franco Fragapane.

Huracán
On 1 July 2019 Club Atlético Huracán announced, that Gómez had joined the club on a one-year loan deal with an option to buy.

References

External links
 
 

1993 births
Living people
Footballers from Santa Fe, Argentina
Argentine footballers
Argentine expatriate footballers
Argentinos Juniors footballers
Club Atlético Independiente footballers
Quilmes Atlético Club footballers
Deportivo Toluca F.C. players
Unión de Santa Fe footballers
San Martín de Tucumán footballers
Club Atlético Huracán footballers
Asteras Tripolis F.C. players
Club Deportivo Palestino footballers
Argentine Primera División players
Liga MX players
Super League Greece players
Chilean Primera División players
Primera Nacional players
Expatriate footballers in Mexico
Argentine expatriate sportspeople in Mexico
Expatriate footballers in Greece
Argentine expatriate sportspeople in Greece
Expatriate footballers in Chile
Argentine expatriate sportspeople in Chile
Association football midfielders